The Annals of Clinical Psychiatry is a psychiatry journal established in 1989 . In 1997 Springer Science+Business Media assumed production . Issues from 2004-2008 are available from Portico. Later it was picked up by the American Academy of Clinical Psychiatrists in 2008 and has been their official journal ever since. At present, the editor in chief is Donald W. Black (University of Iowa).  According to the Journal Citation Reports, the journal has a 2014 impact factor of 2.364.

References

Publications established in 1989
Psychiatry journals
Springer Science+Business Media academic journals
Quarterly journals